The River Clydach is a short, steep and fast-flowing river in Monmouthshire and the county borough of Blaenau Gwent in south Wales. It lies within the Brecon Beacons National Park.

The river rises on the southern slopes of Mynydd Llangatwg then heads south-east through Clydach Dingle past Brynmawr.

"Clydach" is a common name for watercourses in south Wales and is thought to derive from an old Welsh word for "swift" or possibly "stoney", both of which would apply in this case.

References 

Clydach
Clydach
Clydach
Clydach